Håkon Askerød (5 July 1910 – 28 August 1989) was a Norwegian footballer. He played in one match for the Norway national football team in 1935.

References

External links
 

1910 births
1989 deaths
Norwegian footballers
Norway international footballers
Association football goalkeepers
Moss FK players